Disney XD is an American pay television channel owned by the Disney Branded Television and Disney Entertainment units of The Walt Disney Company. The channel is aimed primarily at older children ages six to eleven years old.

Disney XD's programming consists of original first-run television series, current and former original series and made-for-TV films inherited from sister network Disney Channel, theatrically released films, and acquired programs from other distributors, along with a primetime block of programming involving competitive gaming.

The channel offers an alternate Spanish-language audio feed, either via a separate channel with the English track removed as part of a package of Spanish-language television networks sold by subscription providers or a separate audio track accessible through the SAP option, depending on the provider.

As of January 2016, Disney XD is available to 77.5 million households in the United States.

History

Disney XD was launched on February 13, 2009, at 12:00 a.m. Eastern Time, with the Phineas and Ferb episode "Dude, We're Getting the Band Back Together" being the first show to air on the channel. The channel debuted its first original series, Aaron Stone, at 7:00 p.m. New animated series included in the channel's initial lineup were Kid vs. Kat and Jimmy Two-Shoes.

The network took over the channel space of Toon Disney, an animation-focused channel that debuted on April 18, 1998, which eventually launched a live-action/animation block called Jetix in 2004. Jetix channels outside of the United States were relaunched under the Disney XD banner starting with the France-based service on April 1, 2009. Many of the channel's programs – particularly animated series – previously aired on Toon Disney, mainly as part of the Jetix programming block, which ran on Toon Disney until that channel's shutdown. Disney XD carries the same name as an unrelated mini-site and media player on Disney.com, which stood for Disney Xtreme Digital, though it has been stated that the "XD" in the channel's name does not have an actual meaning.

The channel's first original television movie, Skyrunners, premiered on November 27, 2009. On April 1, 2012, Disney XD launched a block called "Marvel Universe", as a result of Disney's 2009 acquisition of Marvel Entertainment. By June 2014, Disney XD agreed to a multi-picture development deal with Two 4 the Money and MarVista Entertainment with MarVista having global rights.

On November 17, 2016, it was announced that the Pokémon anime series would be moving to Disney XD from its previous broadcaster, Cartoon Network. The twentieth season, Pokémon the Series: Sun & Moon, was the first season to air and was first broadcast as a sneak peek on December 5, 2016. Pokémon began its regular broadcast on May 12, 2017.

On August 12, 2017, Disney XD premiered a reboot of DuckTales. In 2018, through a series of promos and news announcements, Disney announced that four of Disney XD's original series (those being Star vs. the Forces of Evil, Milo Murphy's Law, DuckTales, and Big Hero 6: The Series) would be moving their premieres over to Disney Channel, while Disney XD would continue to air re-runs. In 2020, DuckTales and Big Hero 6: The Series were both moved back to Disney XD for their final seasons, which both ended in 2021.

Programming

Disney XD's schedule consists largely of animated and live-action programs aimed at pre-teens and young teenagers. Disney XD content is a mixture of former original series as well as programs inherited from sister network Disney Channel. In addition to full-length live-action and animated original series, the channel also debuts short series similar to those seen on Disney Channel during commercial breaks (such as Two More Eggs), which serve as filler for programs scheduled to end during the half-hour and last usually around one to three minutes.

In addition, Disney XD airs original made-for-TV movies from Disney Channel and theatrically released feature films.

Unlike Disney Channel (and similarly, fellow sister network Disney Junior)—whose advertising comes in the form of program promotions, underwriter sponsorships, and interstitials for Disney films, home video, and game releases produced by the channel—Disney XD operates as an advertiser-supported service running traditional television commercials in addition to promotions for the channel's shows.

Sports
Sister network ESPN has produced sports-oriented content for Disney XD; for a period, the channel produced an interstitial program known as the SportsCenter High-5, which featured a countdown of sports highlights. As part of a deal with ESPN, Disney XD carried coverage of the 2018 Overwatch League as part of its D|XP block.

In 2019, Disney XD began to air the NFL's Pro Bowl, in a simulcast alongside ESPN and ABC.

In March 2023, the channel participated in another sports broadcast as part of its NHL coverage, with Disney Channel and Disney XD airing a 3D animated, Big City Greens-themed presentation of a game.

Programming blocks

Former
Randomation Animation – Randomation Animation was a morning animation block on Saturdays from 8:00 to 11:00 a.m. Eastern Time, which debuted on July 13, 2013. Programs featured in the block included Pac-Man and the Ghostly Adventures, Xiaolin Chronicles, Packages from Planet X, Camp Lakebottom, Max Steel, Randy Cunningham: 9th Grade Ninja, and Phineas and Ferb.
Show Me the Monday – Show Me the Monday was a Monday night programming block that premiered in late 2013. The block presented new episodes of Disney XD original series such as Lab Rats, Mighty Med, Gravity Falls and others.
Animacation – Animacation was a morning animation block that aired weekdays from 10:00 a.m. to 1:00 p.m. during the summer of 2014. The block featured new episodes and reruns of original animated programming, as well as the premieres of Doraemon: Gadget Cat from the Future, Boyster and The 7D.
DXP – a prime-time block that featured video gaming-related programming aimed at teens; the block was introduced on July 15, 2017, and ran from 9:00 p.m. to. 3:00 a.m. Eastern Time. The block draws upon resources from sister properties, such as the Disney-owned multi-channel network Maker Studios (who produced the weekly Polaris Primetime, and curates content from its member personalities for other programming on the block), ESPN (for e-sports coverage), and Vice Media's Waypoint, as well as outside producers and sources such as IGN. On July 16, D / XP presented coverage of the finals of the Super Smash Bros. for Wii U and Street Fighter V tournaments at Evo 2017, complementing coverage of the event across ESPN networks and Twitch. On July 11, 2018, ESPN announced a multi-year deal with Blizzard Entertainment to air Overwatch League matches on ABC, Disney XD (as a part of the DXP block) and the ESPN networks, beginning with the 2018 playoffs.
Anime Block – a block showcasing various anime programs featured on the channel, such as Pokémon, Yo-kai Watch and Beyblade Burst. It launched on February 18, 2017, and aired every Saturday. It was discontinued in 2020 following Netflix's acquisition of the streaming rights to Pokémon.
Marvel on Disney XD – a block of animated series produced by Marvel Animation that aired Sunday mornings from 8:00 to 9:30 a.m. Eastern Time, which resulted from The Walt Disney Company's 2009 acquisition of Marvel Entertainment. The block launched on April 1, 2012, as Marvel Universe with the premiere of Ultimate Spider-Man, followed by returning series The Avengers: Earth's Mightiest Heroes. It also features 5 short series using short-form animated and live-action interstitials. Programs that were featured in the block included Spider-Man (2017), Avengers Assemble, Guardians of the Galaxy, "Marvel Mash-Up" (which features classic Marvel cartoons mashed up with new twists) and "Fury Files".

Related services

International channels

Disney XD, similarly born of a merger between Jetix and Toon Disney, was formerly available around the world. Most of the international Disney XD networks have been closed down from 2019, due to the launch of Disney+.

On 6 January 2019, Disney XD closed down in Australia and New Zealand with programs moving to Disney Channel for that network's last year before its content was subsumed into Disney+. In India, the channel was rebranded as Marvel HQ on January 9, 2019. On October 1, 2019, Disney XD closed in Italy following the non-renewal of its Sky carriage agreement.

The Spanish and German versions were closed on 1 April 2020, followed by France's network a week later. XD in Singapore ceased on June 1, 2020, then the UK & Ireland and continental Africa domestic feeds on October 1, 2020. Together with the Southeast Asian, Scandinavian, and Middle Eastern, feeds closing on December 31, 2020. The Japanese and Turkish channels also closed on January 31, 2021.

The latest closure was in Latin America on March 31, 2022.

As of April 1, 2022, Disney XD only has two sister networks outside of North America; Poland as a full-time network, and the Netherlands as a time-share with Veronica TV.

See also
 Disney Channel - the main channel counterpart to Disney XD
Toon Disney - precursor channel to Disney XD
Jetix - an international brand that aired on Toon Disney

References

External links
 
 Disney XD Press

 
2009 establishments in California
Disney television networks
Children's television networks in the United States
English-language television stations in the United States
Television channels and stations established in 2009
Television networks in the United States